Danilia tinei is a species of sea snail, a marine gastropod mollusk in the family Chilodontidae.

Taxonomy
Monterosato (1914) figured the holotype from Calcara's collection and distinguished as separate species the fossil Danilia otaviana (Cantraine, 1835) and the two Recent Danilia tinei and Danilia horrida (Costa, 1861) = costellata (Costa, 1861), followed in this by Palazzi & Villari (2001). The fossil species is quite convincingly distinguished by a globose shape and much finer sculpture in which the spiral elements clearly dominate. The holotype of D. tinei is also globose but has a coarse sculpture with nodose cords, whereas the common form (including that on photographs herein) should go to Danilia costellata if two species are really to be separated. This is a topic that requires further research.

Description
The size of the shell varies between 7 mm and 10 mm. The imperforate, solid, light brown shell has a conoidal shape with a rounded body whorl and base. Its elevated spire contains 6–7 convex whorls, separated by deep sutures. The first whorl is planorboid and smooth. The next one is lightly rib-striate. The remainder whorls are clathrate, encircled bv strong spiral lirae, crossed by elevated, lamellar, regular, vertical striae. There are 3 or 4 spirals on the penultimate whorl, 9 on the body whorl. The body whorl is rounded, with a strong, prominent varix behind the outer lip. The aperture is rounded, thickened within and a little expanded, a trifle iridescent. The columella is short, vertical with a fold above at the insertion and a strong foldlike tooth below, separated from the plicate basal lip by a deep, narrow, notch.

Distribution
This species occurs in the Mediterranean Sea; in the Atlantic Ocean off the Faroes; Western Norway and Western Ireland

References
Notes

Bibliography
 Monterosato T. A. (di) (1914 (30 giugno)). Sur le genre Danilia. Journal de Conchyliologie 61 (4): 381–384, pl. IX
 Vilvens C. & Héros V. 2005. New species and new records of Danilia (Gastropoda: Chilodontidae) from the Western Pacific. Novapex 6(3) : 53–64

External links
 

tinei
Gastropods described in 1839